The OU812 Tour was a concert tour by hard rock band Van Halen in support of their studio album OU812.

Background
Van Halen began their tour with a United States leg known as the "Monsters of Rock" tour through 23 cities alongside Metallica, Scorpions, Dokken and Kingdom Come which would feature a specially constructed stage with lights and state-of-the-art sound equipment. The tour originated when promoter Louis Messina had approached the band and suggested a five-band summer long tour, in which the band didn't hesitate to sign up. In the end, the leg itself was a financial failure, though it would be their most expensive tour. Some of the cities the band performed in during the "Monsters of Rock" tour had however shown some success while there was confusion from the promoters where the tour didn't do well, bringing up speculation that the album wasn't familiar with the audience yet, while others stated that the shows were on a weekday while school was going on. During the show in East Troy, Hagar fell during the opening song on the set, receiving a minor tailbone fracture. Despite his injury, he did finish the performance. Following the Monsters of Rock tour, the band did go on a brief hiatus before continuing the tour. On the second North American leg, Van Halen performed in smaller venues, wrapping up the tour with shows in Japan and Hawaii.

Reception
Mark Madden, a staff writer from the Pittsburgh Post-Gazette gave the performance at the Three Rivers Stadium a positive review. He acknowledged that more than 35,000 fans couldn't help but be struck when Eddie Van Halen's fleet fingers played through two hours of the band's biggest hits. Regarding Eddie's solo Madden added that the biggest technical sparkle was that he was successfully able to play within the context of his songs and did not play a bad solo that night. Including Hagar, Madden stated that he brought all the fun, with good vocals and songs - but didn't forget to add about Michael Anthony and Alex Van Halen whom Madden stated were a quality foundation. During the conclusion of his review, Madden noted that the biggest strength for the band's performance was definitely their songs.

Jeff Bunch from the Spokesman Review gave the performance at the Albi Stadium a positive review. In his opening statement, Bunch stated that rock 'n' roll was alive and well in Spokane and that it was better than nothing. He noted on the music being "hot", bringing the crowd to decibel levels that matched the band's sound system which he cited as "powerful". He acknowledged the members' solos, with Eddie Van Halen's being cited as "magical" as he captivated the audience for nearly ten minutes with his lightning-quick fingers. Not forgetting Alex Van Halen or Hagar, he brought up their solos as well -  referring to Hagar as a bundle of energy, adding that he is a consummate showman. Bunch concluded his review, stating that it was a great concert, and that people got their money's worth, though he did say that it would be hard to say if the band's show had lived up to its expectations.

Jerry Spangler from the Deseret News gave the Salt Palace performance he attended a mixed review. He stated that while the band had shown to be the best there is on the hard rock circuit, they still lacked the style that could one day make them one of the best bands of all time, referring to them as a good time to a near-capacity crowd they performed for. Spangler noted on one of the show's highlights when Hagar had taken center stage for an acoustic guitar solo, praising it as "warm" and "optimism". He cited that Hagar was the surprise for the show aside from the characteristic of Eddie Van Halen, but did criticize that confidence Hagar presented would translate into inanities.

Setlist
"There's Only One Way to Rock"
"Summer Nights"
"Panama"
"A.F.U. (Naturally Wired)"
"Runnin' with the Devil"
"Why Can't This Be Love"
"Mine All Mine"
"Cabo Wabo"
"Finish What Ya Started"
"5150"
"When It's Love"
"Eagles Fly"
"I Can't Drive 55"
"Best of Both Worlds"
"Black and Blue"
"Ain't Talkin' 'bout Love"
Encore
"You Really Got Me"
"Rock and Roll"

Tour dates

Personnel
 Eddie Van Halen – guitar, backing vocals, lead keyboards
 Michael Anthony – bass, backing vocals, keyboards
 Alex Van Halen – drums
 Sammy Hagar – lead vocals, guitar

References

Van Halen concert tours
1988 concert tours
1989 concert tours